Robert Ames (born 8 October 1985) is a British conductor and violist, who holds the positions of co-Artistic Director and co-Principal Conductor of the London Contemporary Orchestra

Career
Born in Kettering, Northamptonshire, he studied at the Royal Academy of Music. While at University, Robert met Hugh Brunt, who together founded the London Contemporary Orchestra in 2008. He was made an Associate of the Royal Academy of Music in 2016. In September 2016 he was announced as the co-principal conductor of the London Contemporary Orchestra where he conducts across an eclectic range of venues from Oval Space in East London through to Barbican Centre .

Ames regularly works at Abbey Road, the National Theatre and film studio projects such as John Maclean's Slow West (Sundance Film Festival Award), Macbeth and Theeb (BAFTA winning and Oscar nominated).

Ames has collaborated with a wide range of artists including Frank Ocean, Imogen Heap, Ron Arad, Belle and Sebastian, Vivian Westwood, DJ Shadow, Jonny Greenwood, Radiohead and Foals. In 2022, he conducted the first video game prom at the BBC Proms.

References

External links

1985 births
Living people
People from Kettering
English conductors (music)
British male conductors (music)
English classical violists
21st-century British conductors (music)
21st-century British male musicians
21st-century violists